The women's individual all-around competition at the 2011 Summer Universiade was held on August 15 at the Boa'an District Gym.

2011 Summer Universiade events